Tim Wilkison (born November 23, 1959) is a former professional tennis player from the United States.

Tennis career
Wilkison was the No. 1 ranked junior in the United States and played on the tour for over 25 years. The left-hander won six singles titles, ten doubles championships, and reached a career-high singles ranking of world No. 23 in September 1986. Wilkison is perhaps best known for his diving volleys at Wimbledon that earned him the nickname "Dr. Dirt".

In his playing career, Wilkison had victories over Arthur Ashe, Stan Smith, Roscoe Tanner, Guillermo Vilas, Yannick Noah, Boris Becker, Jim Courier, John McEnroe, Andre Agassi, and Pete Sampras.

His best Grand Slam singles result came at the 1986 US Open, where he reached the quarterfinals by defeating Horst Skoff, Paul McNamee, Yannick Noah and Andrei Chesnokov, before losing to Stefan Edberg in straight sets. Wilkison has stated that his preferred surface is clay.

His eldest son, MacLane, now plays at UNC.

Career finals

Singles: 15 (6 titles, 9 runner-ups)

Doubles: 24 (10 titles, 14 runner-ups)

External links
 
 

1959 births
Living people
American male tennis players
People from Shelby, North Carolina
Tennis people from North Carolina